Turkey competed at the 2012 European Athletics Championships in Helsinki, Finland, between 27 June and 1 July 2012.

European Athletics Championships
2012
Nations at the 2012 European Athletics Championships